Sons of Anarchy: Songs of Anarchy Vol. 4 is a soundtrack album featuring music from the FX television program Sons of Anarchy, and is a follow-up to the 2013 release Sons of Anarchy: Songs of Anarchy Vol. 3 and several earlier EPs from the popular show.

The songs are performed by The Forest Rangers, the house band of the series led by Bob Thiele Jr. The Forest Rangers serve as the Sons Of Anarchy house band, which includes the show's music composer Bob Thiele Jr, Greg Leisz (guitar/banjo), John Philip Shenale (keyboards), Lyle Workman (guitar), Dave Way (recording Engineer and Sergeant at Arms), Davey Faragher (bass), Brian Macleod (drums) and Velvet Revolver guitarist Dave Kushner.

"Come join the Murder" performed by The White Buffalo and The Forrest Rangers debuted at number 9 on Billboards Hot Rock chart and claimed the 93 spot on the Hot 100 chart.

Track listing

References

Sons of Anarchy
2015 soundtrack albums